Dave Heaton (born October 19, 1971) is an American businessman and politician and a former member of the Wisconsin State Assembly.

Background
Dave Heaton grew up in a family of 15 siblings. After high school, he joined the Air National Guard where he served from 1990–1996 while simultaneously working his way through college. In 1998, Heaton earned his Juris Doctor degree from DePaul University law school and worked as a prosecutor in Cook County, Illinois. Heaton's career then moved into the private sector as he transitioned from the practice of law into business roles. He currently works as a reinsurance consultant for a company in Wausau.

Elective office 
On April 24, 2014 Heaton announced has candidacy for Wisconsin's 85th Assembly District. Heaton was unopposed in the August Republican primary and on November 4, 2014 Heaton defeated incumbent Mandy Wright by 85 votes out of the over 22,000 cast. After the completion of the final canvass of votes his opponent conceded the tight race. Heaton is the first Republican to represent Wausau in the Assembly in over 50 years.

Electoral history

2015–2017 Legislature 
On January 5, 2015, Representative  Heaton was sworn into the Wisconsin State Assembly as member of a 63 member Republican majority the largest in more than 50 years. For the 2015–2017 Session he serves on the Assembly Committees on Consumer Protection, where he serves as Vice Chairman, Children and Families, Judiciary, and Veterans and Military Affairs.  Heaton was also appointed to serve as a member of the Speaker's Task Force on Urban Education.

On November 17, 2015 the national advocacy organization, Mothers Against Drunk Driving (MADD) recognized Representative Heaton as one of their 2015 Legislators of the Year in Wisconsin. Heaton was recognized for his work on Assembly Bill 266 and Senate Bill 222 that would strengthen the state's ignition interlock law.

Personal life 
Heaton lives in Wausau, Wisconsin with his wife and their three children.

References 

1971 births
Living people
Politicians from Chicago
Politicians from Wausau, Wisconsin
DePaul University College of Law alumni
Northern Illinois University alumni
Military personnel from Wisconsin
Republican Party members of the Wisconsin State Assembly
Businesspeople from Wisconsin
Illinois lawyers
Wisconsin lawyers
21st-century American politicians